Michele Mian (born July 18, 1973 in Gorizia) is an Italian basketball shooting guard. Mian was born in Gorizia, Italy, and won the silver medal with the Italian men's national team at the 2004 Summer Olympics in Athens, Greece. He also competed for his country at the 2000 Summer Olympics.

References
CONI profile

1973 births
Living people
Basketball players at the 2000 Summer Olympics
Basketball players at the 2004 Summer Olympics
FIBA EuroBasket-winning players
Italian men's basketball players
Olympic basketball players of Italy
Olympic silver medalists for Italy
Olympic medalists in basketball
Pallacanestro Cantù players
People from Gorizia
Medalists at the 2004 Summer Olympics
Shooting guards
Sportspeople from Friuli-Venezia Giulia